Sarmich (Sarmych) is a village in eastern Uzbekistan. It is located in Yangiobod District, Jizzakh Region.

References

Populated places in Jizzakh Region